The 1971–72 season was the 48th season in the existence of AEK Athens F.C. and the 13th consecutive season in the top flight of Greek football. They competed in the Alpha Ethniki, the Greek Cup and the European Cup. The season began on 29 August 1971 and finished on 11 June 1972.

Overview

After the distinctions of the previous years, AEK seemed to operate in a "frantic tempo", until this season, which was the passing to a declining period for the team. The team's roster was constantly renewed as a generation of players left, passing the torch to the next one. The new generation was consisted of great and talented players, however the club was not ready to claim a leading role in the league.

AEK participated in the European Cup. The draw was tough for AEK, as from the very first round faced one of the greastest European clubs over time, the great Internazionale of Ivano Bordon, Giacinto Facchetti and Sandro Mazzola. The first match at San Siro in front of almost 80,000 spectators, AEK managed to take the lead at the 14th minute with Pomonis, but Inter's superiority was obvious and after equalizing 5 minutes later, they finished the first half leading by 3–1. The second half turned out to be a standard procedure with Inter raising the score to 4–1 and likewise the few chances of AEK qualifying disappeared. In the rematch at the crowded AEK Stadium no one expected what was about to happen. Everything started wrong for the yellow-blacks, as they were left behind the score at the 17th minute with a goal by Mazzola. Bertini's dismissal two minutes later and Stankovic's offensive style, brought AEK in taking the lead at the half time with Ventouris and Papaioannou, while also having two shoots hit the post. The Italians, wanting if nothing else not to lose, chased the goal and equalized with Boninsegna at the 76th minute. The players of AEK, realizing that the qualification was lost definitively, sought the victory and achieved it with a goal by Nikolaidis at the 89th minute, that made the final 3–2. One of the greatest victories for the then "poor" Greek football and the first great European night for AEK.

In the league they finished third with 6 points from the top. This season was one of the worst for the club's history for the Greek Cup. A very important year for the development of the tournament, as the amateur teams of the local legal associations cease to participate and only the teams of the national divisions could participate. The ties of the first round competed again according to geographical criteria, while from the second round onwards the draw was free. AEK easily overcame PAO Rouf in the First Round and Kozani in the Second Round, but in the Round of 16 they faced Lamia, who to everyone's surprise, eliminated them with 1–0 at the extra time.

Players

Squad information

NOTE: The players are the ones that have been announced by the AEK Athens' press release. No edits should be made unless a player arrival or exit is announced. Updated 30 June 1972, 23:59 UTC+2.

Transfers

In

 a.  plus Dimitris Liakouris and Kostas Chanios, Giorgos Kefalidis and Stelios Skevofilakas as exchange from the next season.

Out

Loan out

Renewals

Overall transfer activity

Expenditure:  ₯600,000

Income:  ₯300,000

Net Total:  ₯300,000

Pre-season and friendlies

Greek Super Cup

Alpha Ethniki

League table

Results summary

Results by Matchday

Fixtures

Greek Cup

Matches

European Cup

First round

Statistics

Squad statistics

! colspan="11" style="background:#FFDE00; text-align:center" | Goalkeepers
|-

! colspan="11" style="background:#FFDE00; color:black; text-align:center;"| Defenders
|-

! colspan="11" style="background:#FFDE00; color:black; text-align:center;"| Midfielders
|-

! colspan="11" style="background:#FFDE00; color:black; text-align:center;"| Forwards
|-

|}

Disciplinary record

|-
! colspan="17" style="background:#FFDE00; text-align:center" | Goalkeepers

|-
! colspan="17" style="background:#FFDE00; color:black; text-align:center;"| Defenders

|-
! colspan="17" style="background:#FFDE00; color:black; text-align:center;"| Midfielders

|-
! colspan="17" style="background:#FFDE00; color:black; text-align:center;"| Forwards

|}

References

External links
AEK Athens F.C. Official Website

AEK Athens F.C. seasons
AEK Athens